Sergio Torres Félix (born 5 June 1966) is a Mexican politician affiliated with the PRI. He served as Deputy of the LXII Legislature of the Mexican Congress representing Sinaloa from 29 August 2012 until 9 April 2013.

See also
 List of presidents of Culiacán Municipality

References

1966 births
Living people
Politicians from Sinaloa
Institutional Revolutionary Party politicians
21st-century Mexican politicians
Municipal presidents in Sinaloa
People from Culiacán
Autonomous University of Sinaloa alumni
Members of the Congress of Sinaloa
Deputies of the LXII Legislature of Mexico
Members of the Chamber of Deputies (Mexico) for Sinaloa